Stellar Corpses is a psychobilly horror punk band formed in Santa Cruz, California in 2005. The first lineup included singer, guitarist and primary songwriter, Dusty Grave, upright bassist Dan Lamothe, drummer, Matt Macabre and lead guitarist, Mr Grim. Their sound and style combines elements of psychobilly, Horror punk, hardcore punk gothic rock and metal. Since their formation Stellar Corpses have continued to tour both in the US as well as internationally.

Stellar Corpses is an astronomy term that means "Dead Stars", a double entendre used by the Dusty in his songwriting to also refer to dead movie stars and rockstars, particularly in the songs Dead Stars Drive-In and Dark Side of the American Dream. On Halloween 2005, Stellar Corpses headlined their first show at the 418 Project in Santa Cruz. 

Since their inception they have released records through Hairball 8 Records, FiendForce Records, Chapter 11 Records and Batcave Records.

Their music has also been featured in the television series Road Trip Masters.

Dusty also plays upright bass for BAT!, signed to Cleopatra Records, and occasionally plays lead guitar for Rezurex.

Respect the Dead EP

Stellar Corpses' first EP, Respect The Dead, was independently released in 2007 on their own label, Santa Carla Records, named after "The Lost Boys" (1987) filmed in their hometown, Santa Cruz. The EP was recorded at The Compound Recording Studios in Santa Cruz by Joe Clements (Singer of Fury 66). Stellar Corpses is said to have made an immediate impact in their genre with songs such as “Cemetery Man” and “Leave A Stellar Corpse.”

Welcome to the Nightmare

Following a five-week European tour with Rezurex, Stellar Corpses released their first full-length album in 2009 entitled, "Welcome to the Nightmare" named after an underground psychobilly zine from Santa Cruz. The album was released in 2009 on Santa Carla Records in the US and FiendForce Records in Germany. The album has been called a "deadly delight" and is said to feature more of the band's influences, without losing any of the power and fury of their debut EP as well as "a competent, driven, and ultimately rather enjoyable take on the narrowly defined genre".

Vampire Kiss

On Halloween 2011, Stellar Corpses released the single "Vampire Kiss" which debuted at No. 9 on the alternative radio charts Kiss Kiss Bang Bang and F.M.B.Q. and hosted a music video premiere at The Viper Room in Hollywood. The music video for "Vampire Kiss", directed by Justin Janowitz stars Alycia Paulsen and features cameos by Hunter Burgan of the band AFI and producer Joe McGrath as vampires. The video was filmed on location at the Santa Cruz Beach Boardwalk and at Bethel Encino Church in the city of Encino.

Dead Stars Drive-In

January 2012 saw the release of the band's second full-length album, "Dead Stars Drive-In" produced, engineered and mixed by Joe McGrath who also had a hand in engineering and/or producing albums for Green Day, Blink 182, AFI, Tiger Army and Alkaline Trio. The title track is an homage to the "dead stars" of Hollywood including Elvis Presley, Marilyn Monroe, Bela Lugosi and  Maila Nurmi, also known as Vampira. The songs "Vampire Kiss", "Evil Dead" and "Dead Stars Drive-In" feature backing vocals from Hunter Burgan (AFI bassist). "Be Still My Heart" features sound design by Jade Puget (AFI guitarist). “Twisted Fantasy” features guest vocals by Michale Graves (former Misfits singer).

Batcave Records

In late 2016 Stellar Corpses lead singer Dusty Grave co-founded Batcave Records with Rene De La Muerte from the Canadian psychobilly band The Brains. The record label is home for Stellar Corpses and The Brains as well as The Thirsty Crows and more up-and-coming bands in the genre.

Hellbound Heart EP

In 2018 Batcave Records co-produced the five song EP "Hellbound Heart" which featured Jimmy Calabrese of Calabrese on the title track.

Members

Current members 
 Dusty Grave - lead vocals, guitar

Touring members 
 Jack Cash - guitar
 Michael Maniacal - bass
 Todd Bowen - drums

Former members 
 Daniel Lamothe - upright bass (died 2023)
 Emilio Menze - guitar
 Jacklyn Paulette - guitar
 Kyle Moore - drums
 Matt Macabre - drums
 Mr. Grim - guitar
 Poison - drums
 Randy Moore- guitar
 Skye Vaughan-Jayne - guitar

Albums

Studio albums

Welcome to the Nightmare (2008)
Dead Stars Drive-In] (2012)

Singles
"Vampire Kiss" (2011)

EPs
Respect The Dead EP (2006)
Hellbound Heart EP (2018)

Compilations
Psycho Ward 2  - "Dr. Plainfield" (2008)
Sonic Seducer Cold Hands Seduction · Vol. 98  - "Teenage Witchcraft" (2009)
Ox-Compilation 85  - "Love Like This" (2009)
The Sound Of Horror Vol. 1  - "My Shadow" (2010)
Psychomania No.7  - "Cemetery Man" (2010)
Psycho Sounds Of The Underground  - "Can't Keep A Good Corpse Down" (2011)
HorrorHound Presents: It's Only a Movie  - "Power of the Night" (2016)

References

External links 
 
Official Facebook Page

Horror punk groups
American psychobilly musical groups
American punk rock groups
Musicians from Santa Cruz, California
Demons Run Amok Entertainment artists